Cyprodime is an opioid antagonist from the morphinan family of drugs.

Cyprodime is a selective opioid antagonist which blocks the μ-opioid receptor, but without affecting the δ-opioid or κ-opioid receptors. This makes it useful for scientific research as it allows the μ-opioid receptor to be selectively deactivated so that the actions of the δ and κ receptors can be studied separately, in contrast to better known opioid antagonists such as naloxone which block all three opioid receptor subtypes.

See also 
 Tianeptine, an atypical, selective MOR full-agonist licensed for major depression since 1989.
 Samidorphan, an opioid antagonist preferring the MOR, which is under development for major depression.

References 

Synthetic opioids
Morphinans
Mu-opioid receptor antagonists
Ketones
Ethers
Phenol ethers